Qutub Bakhsh, more commonly known as Tanras Khan (c. 1801 – c. 1890), was an Indian musician of the Hindustani Classical tradition known for being a luminary of the Delhi Gharana.(House of Delhi classical musicians). He was a court musician and music teacher to the last Mughal emperor Bahadur Shah Zafar II.

Background
Qutub Baksh was born to a musical family and initiated into music by his father, Qadir Baksh of Dasna. He became a disciple of Miyan Achpal of the Delhi Court in order to further develop his music.

Early life and career
"Meer Qutub Baksh alias 'Tanrus Khan' was an iconic Khayal singer of the 19th century."
"Since Delhi has been, off and on, the capital and the cultural center of the North Indian musical tradition, many families originally came from Delhi." "Tanrus Khan was famous for his swift, sparkling Taans and so this title 'Tanrus' (one who has a charming Taan) was given to him by Bahadur Shah Zafar II, the last Mughal emperor."

Occasionally Tanrus Khan sang qawwalis also. So he is also said to be a member of the 'Qawwal Bachchon Ka Delhi Gharana' originally organized by the legendary 13th century musician Amir Khusrow. Many Khayals and Taranas of Hindustani classical music were composed by Tanrus Khan.
Tanrus Khan was attached to Delhi court but after the Mutiny of 1857, he left Delhi and went to Gwalior but felt that he was not much appreciated there. So he went to Nizam of Hyderabad's court and worked there and finally died in Hyderabad in 1885.

Interaction among music gharanas
It is widely known that the founders of Patiala gharana had studied under the tutelage of Tanras Khan, the founder of the Delhi gharana.

According to Manorama Sharma, author of the book, 'Tradition of Hindustani Music' (2006):

"In a very big function, the ceremony of Ganda-Bandhan was performed and both Ali Baksh and Fateh Ali became the disciples of Ustad Tanras Khan. In 1890, after the death of Ustad Tanras Khan, Ali Baksh and Fateh Ali became the disciples of Ustad Haddu Khan and Ustad Hassu Khan of Gwalior Gharana. Afterwards, they also received training from Ustad Bahadur Hussain Khan of Rampur. Thus, it is apparent that Ali Baksh and Fateh Ali received training from the well known musicians and later developed their own style which became famous as the Patiala Gharana. Both of them began to be known as Aliya and Fattu."

Delhi gharana

Prominent exponents
 Ghulam Hussain Khan alias 'Ustad Mian Achpal' (music teacher of Tanrus Khan)
 Ustad Tanrus Khan
 Ustad Umrao Khan (Tanrus Khan's son)
 Ustad Sardar Khan (Umrao Khan's son)
 Ustad Manzoor Ahmed Khan Niazi
 Ustad Munshi Raziuddin
 Qawwal Bahauddin Khan
 Ustad Abdullah Manzoor Niazi (Ustad Manzoor's Son)
 Ustad Meraj Ahmed Nizami
 Ustad Fareed Ayaz 
 Ustad Naseeruddin Sami
 Qawal Najmuddin Saifuddin & Brothers, 
 Hamza Akram Qawwal
 Subhan Ahmed Nizami

References

1890 deaths
19th-century Indian musicians
Musicians from Delhi
Hindustani musicians
19th-century Indian Muslims
Indian classical composers
Indian male classical musicians
19th-century male musicians
Year of birth uncertain